R. v. Constanza [1997] is an English case reaching the Court of Appeal and is well-known (amongst other cases) for establishing the legal precedent in English criminal law that assault could be committed by causing the victim to apprehend violence which was to take place some time in the not immediate future, that it is not necessary for the victim to see the potential perpetrator of the violence, and that it was for the prosecution to prove that fear was in the victim's mind, but how it got there is irrelevant.

Facts
Mr Constanza was charged with assault occasioning actual bodily harm contrary to section 47 of the Offences against the Person Act 1861. The case against him was that his behaviour was such as to cause the victim (Louise Wilson) to feel that his actions posed a threat to her personal safety. The Crown maintained that Constanza's behaviour, which included, inter alia, following her, making silent telephone calls and writing on her door, and which was described as stalking, writing over 800 letters to her in 4 months, had caused this great fear. Constanza had delivered a letter by hand which when read caused belief Constanza had "flipped" and would use force against her. There was medical evidence of a resultant clinical state of depression and anxiety. The Crown said that Constanza's actions had occasioned actual bodily harm.

Judgment
Constanza appealed against his conviction on the grounds that the case ought not to have been left to the jury as the violence that the victim feared had not been sufficiently immediate because the victim could not see the potential perpetrator. Constanza also argued that an assault could not be committed solely by words, but physical action was necessary.

The appeal was dismissed. The Court of Appeal held that the time to start measuring the immediacy of the apprehended violence is the time when the victim has the fear, that it would not be right to leave the case to the jury when the violence was anticipated at some time in the distant future and that it is not necessary for the victim to be able to see the potential perpetrator of the violence. In this case, as the victim had believed that the violence could occur at any time, the judge was entitled to leave the question of whether or not the victim had a fear of immediate violence to the jury. The Court of Appeal also held that it is for the Crown (the Prosecution) to prove that fear was in the victim's mind and that it is irrelevant how it got there and that certain conduct accompanying words could make that an assault. Therefore, the appellant had committed assault.

Precautionary government reaction
In case of further instances, argued or appealed successfully for the defence, based on remoteness of the truly feared action, Parliament, passing a government bill, introduced the Protection from Harassment Act 1997. Its maximum sentence is custodial.

External links
 Transcript of the judgement in this case on BAILII

C
1997 in British law
Court of Appeal (England and Wales) cases
1997 in case law